Mogh Ahmad-e Bala (also Romanized as Mogh Aḩmad-e Bālā) is a village in Gachin Rural District, in the Central District of Bandar Abbas County, Hormozgan Province, Iran. At the 2006 census, its population was 584, in 121 families.

References 

Populated places in Bandar Abbas County